Momoko Saito (born 8 September 1981) is a former Japanese cricketer who played five Women's One Day International cricket matches for Japan national women's cricket team in 2003.

References

1981 births
Living people
Japanese women cricketers